The Railway Museum of Thessaloniki is a museum in Eleftherio-Kordelio, a municipality of the city of Thessaloniki, Central Macedonia, Greece. It was founded in 2001 and is housed in the old Military Railway Station A of the Thessaloniki-Constantinople Railway, near the current TX-3 signalbox. This historic station was built in 1891–1894 by the Italian architect Pietro Arrigoni.

In the station-master’s office inside the station building there is a map with all Greek railway lines marked on it, railway workers’ uniforms, railway workmen’s tools, personal belongings, technical manuals and details of all old steam engines and diesel engines belonging to the Greek railways. The museum is also home to some of the furnishings from the carriages of the former Greek royal family. In the museum courtyard there is a restaurant carriage from the renowned Orient Express, which is open to visitors.

There are plans to put fifteen old OSE engines on display in front of the museum; these engines are at present undergoing reconstruction work. As from the summer of 2002 young friends of the railway can travel to the museum on the children’s train which departs from the new railway station of Thessaloniki.

Photography is allowed only by advance arrangement.

Rolling stock collection

The rolling stock collection includes:
 A SEK Class Ζα (De Glehn) 4-6-0 steam locomotive, possibly Ζα306.
 Two SEK Class Δα (USATC S100) 0-6-0T steam locomotives
 A luxury restaurant car used with the Orient Express trains
 A railway crane and an oil-tank car of Piraeus-Demerli-Frontier railway

References

Sources

External links 

 Museum web site

Railway stations opened in 1894
Museums in Thessaloniki
Thessaloniki
Museums established in 2001
2001 establishments in Greece
Rail transport in Central Macedonia